The Monteverdi Palm Beach is a concept car built by Monteverdi  in  March, 1975 on a shortened Monteverdi High Speed 375C chassis. It was first shown at the Geneva Motor Show in the same year. The car never went into production and remained a one-off.

History 
The Palm Beach was first presented to the public at the Geneva Motor Show in March 1975. The exterior featured copper-coloured paint while the interior was finished in cream-coloured leather. The purchase price of the Palm Beach was given as 124,000 Swiss francs.

In the press, the opinion was that the Palm Beach was the convertible version of the Monteverdi Berlinetta. This was however inaccurate as the Palm Beach was directly based on the four-years older High Speed 375 C. The Palm Beach was the second convertible model built by Monteverdi on a High Speed chassis. The first featured different styling cues.

On the exterior the Palm Beach took on the design cues of the Berlinetta, especially its low front end with the striking narrow radiator grille and the twin square headlamps, while the tail lights were sourced from a Triumph TR6. Otherwise, the Palm Beach was mostly similar to the 375 C not only in chassis but also the drive train. This included a conventional 440 cu in (7.2 L) V8 engine from Chrysler, also found in the volume model High Speed 375 L, instead of the 7.0 L Hemi used in the Berlinetta.

Performance 
The Chrysler 440 V8 produced 300 hp and 449 ft-lb of torque. Although no real world figures are available, the Palm Beach has a theoretical 0-60 mph time of 5.4 seconds and a quarter mile time of 13.7 seconds. The theoretical top speed is 235 km/h.

References 

Monteverdi vehicles
Concept cars
Convertibles
Cars introduced in 1975